James Frederick Lindley (16 May 1935 – 23 March 2022) was an English jockey who competed in flat racing. After retiring as a jockey he spent nearly 30 years as a horse racing commentator and broadcaster.

During his career as a jockey, he won three Classic races: the 2,000 Guineas in 1963 and 1966 and the St Leger in 1964.

Major wins
Ascot Gold Cup - Precipice Wood (1970), Lassalle (1973)
2000 Guineas - Only For Life (1963), Kashmir (1966)
Coronation Cup - Charlottown (1967)
King George VI and Queen Elizabeth Stakes - Aggressor (1960)
St James's Palace Stakes - Track Spare (1966), Sun Prince (1972)
St Leger - Indiana (1964)

References

1935 births
2022 deaths
English jockeys
British horse racing writers and broadcasters
BBC sports presenters and reporters